The Administrative Court of Thailand is a branch of the national judiciary, concerning grievances against state agencies or public officials. It was first established in 2001, in accordance with the 1997 Constitution, along with the Office of the Ombudsman. The court is composed of two tiers: the administrative courts of first instance, and the Supreme Administrative Court.

References

Further reading

Judiciary of Thailand
Administrative courts
2001 establishments in Thailand
Courts and tribunals established in 2001